Altukhovo is a rural locality (a village) in Zaraysky District of Moscow Oblast, Russia.

References

Rural localities in Zaraysky District, Moscow Oblast